The Puebla American School Foundation is a private school serving students in kindergarten through grade 12 in Puebla, Mexico.

The school offers the International Baccalaureate Diploma and the local BUAP (Benemérita Universidad Autónoma de Puebla) for the upper school. For elementary and middle school students, the IB Primary Years and Middle Years Programme are offered.

The school participates in the Model United Nations, PASMUN.

Curriculum
In 1995, the school associated with the International Baccalaureate Organization. By 2006, the school was authorized to teach the three IBO programs: the IB Primary Years Programme, Middle Years Programme, and Diploma Programme. The American School of Puebla was the first school in the city of Puebla and only fifth in the country to be authorized to teach all three IB programs.

See also
 American immigration to Mexico

External links
 Official website

References

Educational institutions established in 1942
International Baccalaureate schools in Mexico
Puebla (city)
Education in Puebla
Private schools in Mexico
1942 establishments in Mexico